Quincula is a monotypic genus of flowering plants in the nightshade family, Solanaceae. The sole species it contains, Quincula lobata, is commonly known as Chinese lantern, lobed groundcherry, or purple groundcherry.

This plant is also classified as Physalis lobata in genus Physalis.

Distribution
It is native to the southwestern United States as far east as Kansas and Oklahoma, as well as northern Mexico, where it grows in many types of open, dry habitat, including disturbed areas.

Description
It is a perennial herb producing ridged, spreading stems up to half a meter long. The lance-shaped leaves are up to 7 centimeters long, smooth or lobed on the edges. The flowers blooming from the leaf axils are up to 2 centimeters wide, widely bell-shaped or flat-faced with five vague, pointed lobes, not drooping like those of many Physalis species. They are purple in color, sometimes with white deep in the throats. The bell-shaped calyx of sepals at the base of the flower enlarges as the fruit develops, becoming an inflated, lanternlike structure up to 2 centimeters long which contains the berry.

Phylogenetic studies suggest that Quincula is closely related to the small North American genus Chamaesaracha.

References

External links

Calflora Database: Physalis lobata (Lobed ground cherry) — formerly Quincula lobata.
Jepson Manual eFlora treatment — formerly Quincula lobata.
Kansas Wildflowers
UC Photos gallery of Physalis lobata (Quincula lobata)

Physaleae
Monotypic Solanaceae genera
Flora of Northwestern Mexico
Flora of the Southwestern United States
Flora of the South-Central United States
Flora of Baja California
Flora of the California desert regions
Taxa named by Constantine Samuel Rafinesque
Flora without expected TNC conservation status